In molecular biology, Small nucleolar RNA SNORD86 (also known as U86) is a non-coding RNA (ncRNA) that belongs to the C/D family of snoRNAs. It is the human orthologue of Xenopus laevis U86 and has no identified RNA target. The snoRNAs U86, U56, U57 and HBII-55,of the C/D family, and the H/ACA box snoRNA ACA51 share the same host gene (NOL5A) with U86.

References

External links 
 

Small nuclear RNA